Alain Tribert Mutabazi is a Burundian politician who was the governor of northern Province of Kirundo and currently serving as Minister of Defense.

Background 
Mutabazi is a native of the Ntega commune in Kirondu province. He was educated at the University of Burundi where he was a representative of the Imbonerakure youth. He was a Director of Vocational Education in Kirundo province and was later appointed Economic Advisor to the Governor of the Kirondu Province whom he would later succeed in office. He was appointed Minister of National Defense and Veteran Affairs by President Evariste Ndayis in 2020.

References 

Burundian politicians
Living people
Government ministers of Burundi
Year of birth missing (living people)

Burundian people
University of Burundi alumni